Jean II may refer to:
 Jean II D' Hayti (c. 1978-present) count of Nwo
 Jean II de Trie (c. 1225–1302), Count of Dammartin
 Jean II Duke of Brabant (1275–1312), John the Peaceful, Duke of Brabant, Lothier and Limburg
 Jean II de La Tour du Pin, Dauphin du Viennois (1280–1319), dauphin of Viennois
 Jean II de Giblet (died 1315), Christian prince of the House of Giblet, an area of the Holy Land
 Jean II of France (1319–1364), called John the Good, King of France
 Jean II Le Meingre Boucicaut (1366–1421), marshal of France
 Jean II de Bourgogne, the Fearless, (1371–1419), Duke of Burgundy
 Jean II de Croÿ (1390? – 1473), Prince of Chimay and progenitor of the line of Croÿ-Solre
 Jean II, Duke of Alençon (1409–1476), Duke of Alençon and Count of Perche
 John II, Duke of Lorraine (1424–1470), Duke of Lorraine
 Jean II de Bourbon (1426–1488), John the Good or The Scourge of the English, Duke of Bourbon and Auvergne
 Jean II, Lord of Monaco (1468–1505), Lord of Monaco
 Jean II d'Estrées (1624–1707), Marshal of France, and naval commander
 Jean II Restout (1692–1768), French Neoclassical painter
 Jean II, Count of Hainaut (1247–1304), oldest son of John I of Avesnes and Adelaide of Holland
 Jean II Makoun (born 1983), Cameroonian football player

See also
 John II (disambiguation)
 Juan II (disambiguation)